The snowy-throated babbler (Stachyris oglei) is a species of bird in the family Timaliidae. It is found in mountains of far Northeast India, i.e. northeast Assam and southeast Arunachal Pradesh.

Its natural habitats are subtropical or tropical moist lowland forest and subtropical or tropical moist shrubland. It is threatened by habitat loss.

References

Collar, N. J. & Robson, C. 2007. Family Timaliidae (Babblers)  pp. 70 – 291 in; del Hoyo, J., Elliott, A. & Christie, D.A. eds. Handbook of the Birds of the World, Vol. 12. Picathartes to Tits and Chickadees. Lynx Edicions, Barcelona.

snowy-throated babbler
Birds of Northeast India
snowy-throated babbler
Taxonomy articles created by Polbot